The 2023 Copa do Brasil first round was the first round of the 2023 Copa do Brasil football competition. It was played from 21 February to 2 March 2023. A total of 80 teams competed in the first round to decide 40 places in the second round of the tournament.

Draw
The draw for the first and second rounds was held on 8 February 2023, 14:00 at CBF headquarters in Rio de Janeiro. Teams were seeded by their CBF ranking (shown in parentheses). The 80 qualified teams were divided in eight groups (A-H) with 10 teams each. The matches were drawn from the respective confronts: A vs. E; B vs. F; C vs. G; D vs. H. The lower-ranked teams will host the first round match.

Format
In the first round, each tie was played on a single-legged basis. The lower-ranked team hosted the match. If tied after 90 minutes, the higher-ranked team would automatically advance to second round.

Matches
Times are BRT (UTC−3), as listed by CBF (local times, if different, are in parentheses).

|}

Match 1

Match 2

Match 3

Match 4

Match 5

Match 6

Match 7

Match 8

Match 9

Match 10

Match 11

Match 12

Match 13

Match 14

Match 15

Match 16

Match 17

Match 18

Match 19

Match 20

Match 21

Match 22

Match 23

Match 24

Match 25

Match 26

Match 27

Match 28

Match 29

Match 30

Match 31

Match 32

Match 33

Match 34

Match 35

Match 36

Match 37

Match 38

Match 39

Match 40

References

2023 in Brazilian football
Copa do Brasil seasons